Robin Campbell may refer to:

Robin Campbell (athlete) (born 1959), American athlete
Robin Campbell (politician) (born 1955), politician in Alberta, Canada
Robin Campbell (musician), musician with UB40